Peter McPherson may refer to:

M. Peter McPherson (born 1940), American academic and government administrator
Peter McPherson (American football) (1874–1941), American football player
Peter McPherson (soccer) (born 1984), Australian soccer player
Peter McPherson (tennis) (20th century), Australian tennis player, doubles partner of John Hillebrand

See also
Peter MacPherson (1841–1913), member of the Queensland Legislative Council